The Li Ka Shing Faculty of Medicine or LKS Faculty of Medicine (HKUMed), formerly known as the Faculty of Medicine of the University of Hong Kong, is a medical school which comprises several schools and departments that provide an array of tertiary programmes in medicine, nursing, pharmacy and chinese medicine. English is the medium of instruction in all of the classes while Chinese is also retained for the teaching of Chinese medicine. It is located several kilometres away from the main campus of the university and is near the Queen Mary Hospital which is its main teaching facility and research base. Founded in 1887, it is also one of the oldest western medical schools in the Far East.

According to the THE World University Rankings 2023 by subject: clinical and health, HKUMed is ranked as 13th worldwide, 2nd in Asia, and 1st in Hong Kong. It is a leading contributor of high-quality clinical research to the Asia-Pacific region and beyond.

HKU Medical Faculty is the older of the two medical faculties in Hong Kong, the other one being the Faculty of Medicine, The Chinese University of Hong Kong. Together they are the sole two tertiary institutions offering medical and pharmacy education and research in the city.

History
The London Missionary Society founded the institution in 1887. Ho Kai, James Cantlie, Patrick Manson and G. P. Jordan were the founding professionals. Important initiatives were led by notable members such as Patrick Manson, an experienced medical practitioner who made his name in the field of tropical medicine. Having served in the Chinese Imperial Maritime Customs as a medical officer for 18 years, he took up private practice in Hong Kong from 1883 to 1889. Sir Kai Ho Kai was also a member of the Chinese elite in Colonial Hong Kong.  He played a major role in convincing the Chinese population that western medicine was acceptable in a culture that had been largely dominated by traditional Chinese medicine.

In 1907 the school was renamed the Hong Kong College of Medicine. In 1908 it was authorized to sign death certificates. The nucleus of the school would later create the foundation for the new University of Hong Kong in 1910. Chinese society at the time was not quite ready for western medicine. As a result, many of the medical graduates had difficulty finding employment.

The college was merged to become the medical school of HKU in 1911, one of the university's first faculties. The establishment of the Queen Mary Hospital in 1937 brought the faculty a major clinical teaching and research base. However, the Japanese occupation in the city during the Second World War disrupted teaching and many staff and students were imprisoned. Following the end of the war, it reopened and soon became an important training centre of clinicians in the city with many departments and schools in healthcare and medical sciences opened. Important milestones include being the world's first team that successfully identified the SARS coronavirus, the causative agent of the pandemic SARS on 21 March 2003. This was followed by the visit of Wen Jiabao to the faculty acknowledging the institute's contribution, the first time a Premier of China had visited a university in Hong Kong. Moreover, a State Key laboratory for emerging infectious diseases was established, the first of its kind located outside mainland China. The faculty launched a Bachelor of Pharmacy programme in 2008, being the second and of two institutions in the city offering pharmacy education.

Admission and Programmes
Currently the Faculty offers seven undergraduate degree programmes:

 Bachelor of Medicine and Bachelor of Surgery
 Bachelor of Nursing
 Bachelor of Chinese Medicine
 Bachelor of Pharmacy
 Bachelor of Arts and Sciences in Global Health Development
 Bachelor of Biomedical Sciences
 Bachelor of Arts and Sciences in Global Health and Development

A new programme, Bachelor of Science in Bioinformatics, is set to receive its first intake in the 2022/23 academic year.

Medical graduates are awarded the M.B., B.S.; the equivalent degree offered by the CUHK Faculty of Medicine is the M.B., Ch.B. Both degrees are based on the United Kingdom's model for medical degrees. Moreover, the Faculty also provides various postgraduate programmes, including postgraduate diplomas, master's and doctoral degrees.

Schools and Departments
 Department of Anaesthesiology
 Department of Clinical Oncology
 Department of Diagnostic Radiology
 Department of Family Medicine and Primary Care
 Department of Medicine
 Department of Microbiology
 Department of Obstetrics and Gynaecology
 Department of Ophthalmology
 Department of Orthopaedics and Traumatology
 Department of Paediatrics and Adolescent Medicine
 Department of Pathology
 Department of Pharmacology and Pharmacy
 Department of Psychiatry
 Department of Surgery
 School of Biomedical Sciences
 School of Chinese Medicine
 School of Public Health
 School of Nursing

Controversy

Scandal of former Dean in SARS plague

In early 2007, the Council of the University of Hong Kong formally accepted the resignation of Professor Lam Shiu-kum (O.B.E.), Dean of the Li Ka Shing Faculty of Medicine, with immediate effect. During the 2003 SARS outbreak Lam had been publicly critical of the Prince of Wales Hospital (PWH), the principal teaching hospital of the other medical school in Hong Kong, the Faculty of Medicine, the Chinese University of Hong Kong, and blamed some of the difficulties which ensued on the PWH (a statement felt by some others to be unfair and unhelpful). News of a possible problem relating to irregularities in the billing of patients being the underlying reason for Lam's sudden and unheralded departure may serve to weaken the moral force of some of Lam's criticisms. It was acknowledged by the University of Hong Kong that Lam's resignation was a "highly unusual" event.

In September 2009, Lam Shiu-kum was sentenced to 25 months in jail after pleading guilty to misconduct in public office. The misconduct involved inducing 12 patients who were treated at Queen Mary Hospital, to pay what appeared to be medical bills issued by the university and the hospital between 2003 and 2007 but were payable to Gastrointestinal Research, a company wholly owned by Professor Lam. He admitted pocketing almost $4 million in donations. In passing sentence, Judge Li said although the patients' well-being was not compromised and they suffered no financial losses, Lam had seriously breached the trust of both the faculty and his patients. Setting a starting point of five years jail, the judge deducted 35 months for Professor Lam's guilty plea, his good character and the fact that he had repaid all the money. Professor Lam earlier pleaded guilty to one count of misconduct in public office, but denied more than 30 charges of theft and fraud. The prosecution had agreed not to proceed with those charges.

Renaming of the faculty
As one of the founding faculties of the University of Hong Kong, the Faculty of Medicine changed to its present name after securing a pledge of a HK$ 1 billion donation from businessman and philanthropist Li Ka-shing under the funding of Li Ka Shing Foundation. The renaming was objected to by many students and prominent alumni of the faculty. Despite this, the university officially renamed the faculty on 1 January 2006.

Notable alumni
Hong Kong College of Medicine
 Sun Yat-sen, Chinese revolutionary, first president and founding father of the Republic of China
 Hong Kui Wong (黄康衢) (1876-1961).  He graduated from Hong Kong College of Medicine for Chinese in 1900.  He moved to Singapore in 1900 and practiced Western medicine there, while participating in the Chinese Revolution with Dr. Sun Yat-Sen as one of the key members of the Nanyang Branch of Tongmenghui (中国同盟会南洋分会).

Teaching Hospitals
 Queen Mary Hospital (Hong Kong)
 The Duchess of Kent Children's Hospital at Sandy Bay
 Grantham Hospital
 Alice Ho Miu Ling Nethersole Hospital
 Kowloon Hospital
 MacLehose Medical Rehabilitation Centre
 Pamela Youde Nethersole Eastern Hospital
 Ruttonjee Hospital
 Tsan Yuk Hospital
 Tung Wah Hospital
 Hong Kong Sanatorium and Hospital

See also

 Hong Kong College of Medicine for Chinese
 Medical education in Hong Kong
 University of Hong Kong
 Li Ying College

References

Medical schools in Hong Kong
University of Hong Kong
1887 establishments in Hong Kong